Messina (also) is a harbour city and the capital of the Italian Metropolitan City of Messina. It is the third largest city on the island of Sicily, and the 13th largest city in Italy, with a population of more than 219,000 inhabitants in the city proper and about 650,000 in the Metropolitan City. It is located near the northeast corner of Sicily, at the Strait of Messina and it is an important access terminal to Calabria region, Villa San Giovanni, Reggio Calabria on the mainland. According to Eurostat the FUA of the metropolitan area of Messina has, in 2014, 277,584 inhabitants.

The city's main resources are its seaports (commercial and military shipyards), cruise tourism, commerce, and agriculture (wine production and cultivating lemons, oranges, mandarin oranges, and olives). The city has been a Roman Catholic Archdiocese and Archimandrite seat since 1548 and is home to a locally important international fair. The city has the University of Messina, founded in 1548 by Ignatius of Loyola.

History

Founded by Greek colonists in the 8th century BC, Messina was originally called Zancle, from the Greek  meaning "scythe" because of the shape of its natural harbour (though a legend attributes the name to King Zanclus). A comune of its Metropolitan City, located at the southern entrance of the Strait of Messina, is to this day called 'Scaletta Zanclea'. Solinus wrote that the city of Metauros was established by people from Zancle.

In the early 5th century BC, Anaxilas of Rhegium renamed it Messene in honour of the Greek city Messene (See also List of traditional Greek place names). Later, Micythus was the ruler of Rhegium and Zancle, and he also founded the city of Pyxus.
The city was sacked in 397 BC by the Carthaginians and then reconquered by Dionysius I of Syracuse.

In 288 BC the Mamertines seized the city by treachery, killing all the men and taking the women as their wives. The city became a base from which they ravaged the countryside, leading to a conflict with the expanding regional empire of Syracuse. Hiero II, tyrant of Syracuse, defeated the Mamertines near Mylae on the Longanus River and besieged Messina. Carthage assisted the Mamertines because of a long-standing conflict with Syracuse over dominance in Sicily. When Hiero attacked a second time in 264 BC, the Mamertines petitioned the Roman Republic for an alliance, hoping for more reliable protection. Although initially reluctant to assist lest it encourage other mercenary groups to mutiny, Rome was unwilling to see Carthaginian power spread further over Sicily and encroach on Italy. Rome, therefore, entered into an alliance with the Mamertines. In 264 BC, Roman troops were deployed to Sicily, the first time a Roman army acted outside the Italian Peninsula. At the end of the First Punic War it was a free city allied with Rome. In Roman times Messina, then known as Messana, had an important pharos (lighthouse). Messana was the base of Sextus Pompeius, during his war against Octavian.

After the fall of the Western Roman Empire, the city was successively ruled by Goths from 476, then by the Byzantine Empire in 535, by the Arabs in 842, and in 1061 by the Norman brothers Robert Guiscard and Roger Guiscard (later count Roger I of Sicily). In 1189 the English King Richard I ("The Lionheart") stopped at Messina en route to the Holy Land for the Third Crusade and briefly occupied the city after a dispute over the dowry of his sister, who had been married to William the Good, King of Sicily. In 1345 Orlando d'Aragona, the illegitimate son of Frederick II of Sicily was the strategos of Messina.

In 1347, Messina was one of the first points of entry for the black death into Western Europe. Genoese galleys travelling from the infected city of Kaffa carried plague into the Messina ports. Kaffa had been infected via Asian trade routes and the siege of Kaffa from infected Mongol armies led by Janibeg; it was a departure point for many Italian merchants who fled the city to Sicily. Contemporary accounts from Messina tell of the arrival of "Death Ships" from the East, which floated to shore with all the passengers on board already dead or dying of plague. Plague-infected rats probably also came aboard these ships. The black death ravaged Messina and rapidly spread northward into mainland Italy from Sicily in the following few months.

In 1548 St. Ignatius founded there the first Jesuit college in the world, which later gave birth to the Studium Generale (the current University of Messina).  The Christian ships that won the Battle of Lepanto (1571) left from Messina: the Spanish author Miguel de Cervantes, who took part in the battle, recovered for some time in the Grand Hospital. The city reached the peak of its splendour in the early 17th century, under Spanish domination: at the time it was one of the ten greatest cities in Europe.

In 1674 the city rebelled against the foreign garrison. It managed to remain independent for some time, thanks to the help of the French king Louis XIV, but in 1678, with the Peace of Nijmegen, it was reconquered by the Spaniards and sacked: the university, the senate and all the privileges of autonomy it had enjoyed since the Roman times were abolished. A massive fortress was built by the occupants and Messina decayed steadily. In 1743, 48,000 died of a second wave of plague in the city.

In 1783, an earthquake devastated much of the city, and it took decades to rebuild and rekindle the cultural life of Messina. In 1847 it was one of the first cities in Italy where Risorgimento riots broke out. In 1848 it rebelled openly against the reigning Bourbons, but was heavily suppressed again. Only in 1860, after the Battle of Milazzo, the Garibaldine troops occupied the city. One of the main figures of the unification of Italy, Giuseppe Mazzini, was elected deputy at Messina in the general elections of 1866. Another earthquake of less intensity damaged the city on 16 November 1894. The city was almost entirely destroyed by an earthquake and associated tsunami on the morning of 28 December 1908, killing about 100,000 people and destroying most of the ancient architecture. The city was largely rebuilt in the following year. However, thousands of residents displaced by the earthquake lived in shanty towns outside the city until the late 1930s, when further reconstruction finally commenced.

It incurred further damage from the massive Allied air bombardments of 1943; before and during the Allied invasion of Sicily. Messina, owing to its strategic importance as a transit point for Axis troops and supplies sent to Sicily from mainland Italy, was a prime target for the British and American air forces, which dropped some 6,500 tons of bombs in the span of a few months. These raids destroyed one-third of the city, and caused 854 deaths among the population. The city was awarded a Gold Medal of Military Valor and one for Civil Valor by the Italian government in memory of the event and the subsequent effort of reconstruction.

In June 1955, Messina was the location of the Messina Conference of Western European foreign ministers which led to the creation of the European Economic Community. The conference was held mainly in Messina's City Hall building (it), and partly in nearby Taormina.

The city is home to a small Greek-speaking minority, which arrived from the Peloponnese between 1533 and 1534 when fleeing the expansion of the Ottoman Empire. They were officially recognised in 2012.

Climate
Messina has a subtropical Mediterranean climate with long, hot summers with low diurnal temperature variation with consistent dry weather. In winter, Messina is rather wet and mild. Diurnals remain low and remain averaging above  lows even during winter. It is rather rainier than Reggio Calabria on the other side of the Messina Strait, a remarkable climatic difference for such a small distance.

Government

Main sights

Religious architecture

 The cathedral (12th century), containing the remains of the king Conrad, ruler of Germany and Sicily in the 13th century. The building had to be almost entirely rebuilt in 1919–20, following the devastating 1908 earthquake, and again in 1943, after a fire triggered by Allied bombings. The original Norman structure can be recognised in the apsidal area. The façade has three late Gothic portals, the central of which probably dates back to the early 15th century. The architrave is decorated with a sculpture of Christ Among the Evangelists and various representations of men, animals and plants. The tympanum dates back to 1468. The interior is organised in a nave and two equally long aisles divided by files of 28 columns. Some decorative elements belong the original building, although the mosaics in the apse are reconstructions. Tombs of illustrious men besides Conrad IV include those of Archbishops Palmer (died in 1195), Guidotto de Abbiate (14th century) and Antonio La Legname (16th century). Special interest is held by the Chapel of the Sacrament (late 16th century), with scenic decorations and 14th-century mosaics. The bell tower holds the Messina astronomical clock, one of the largest astronomical clocks in the world, built-in 1933 by the Ungerer Company of Strasbourg. The belfry's mechanically animated statues, which illustrate events from the civil and religious history of the city every day at noon, are a popular tourist attraction.
 The Sanctuary of Santa Maria del Carmelo (near the Courthouse), built-in 1931, contains a 17th-century statue of the Virgin Mary. See also Chiesa del Carmine.
 The Sanctuary of Montevergine, where the incorrupt body of Saint Eustochia Smeralda Calafato is preserved.
 The Church of the Santissima Annunziata dei Catalani (late 12th–13th century). Dating from the late Norman period, it was transformed in the 13th century when the nave was shortened and the façade added. It has a cylindrical apse and a high dome emerging from a high tambour. Noteworthy is the external decoration of the transept and the dome area, with a series of blind arches separated by small columns, clearly reflecting Arabic architectural influences.
 The Church of Santa Maria degli Alemanni (early 13th century), which was formerly a chapel of the Teutonic Knights. It is a rare example of pure Gothic architecture in Sicily, as is witnessed by the arched windows and shapely buttresses.

Civil and military architecture

 The Botanical Garden Pietro Castelli of the University of Messina.
 The Palazzo Calapaj-d'Alcontresj, an example of 18th-century Messinese architecture which is one of the few noble palazzi to have survived the 1908 earthquake.
 The Forte del Santissimo Salvatore, a 16th-century fort in the Port of Messina.
 The Forte Gonzaga, a 16th-century fort overlooking Messina.
 The Porta Grazia, 17th-century gate of the "Real Cittadella di Messina", by Domenico Biundo and Antonio Amato, a fortress still existing in the harbour.
 The Pylon, built in 1957 together with a twin located across the Strait of Messina, to carry a 220 kV overhead power line bringing electric power to the island. At the time of their construction, the two electric pylons were the highest in the world. The power line has since been replaced by an underwater cable, but the pylon still stands as a freely accessible tourist attraction.
 The San Ranieri lighthouse, built in 1555.
 The Palazzo della Provincia (Palazzo dei Leoni), provincial Seat, built in 1914 by Alessandro Giunta.
 The Palace of Culture, built in 2009.

Monuments
The Fountain of Orion, a monumental civic sculpture located next to the cathedral, built in 1547 by Giovanni Angelo Montorsoli, student of Michelangelo, with a Neoplatonic-alchemical program. It was considered by art historian Bernard Berenson "the most beautiful fountain of the sixteenth century in Europe".
The Fountain of Neptune, looking towards the harbour, built by Montorsoli in 1557.
The monument to John of Austria, by Andrea Camalech (1572)
The Senatory Fountain, built in 1619.
The Four Fountains, though only two elements of the four-cornered complex survive today.
LaFenice, a sculpture on Piazza della Memoria

Museums
Museo Regionale di Messina (MuMe) hosting notable paintings by Caravaggio, Antonello da Messina, Alonzo Rodriguez, Mattia Preti
The Galleria d'Arte Contemporanea di Messina, hostings paintings by Giò Pomodoro, Renato Guttuso, Lucio Fontana, Corrado Cagli, Giuseppe Migneco, Max Liebermann

Public transport

Railways 
The new Messina Centrale station building was projected following the modern criteria of the futurist architect Angiolo Mazzoni, and is extended through the stations square. It is at almost contiguous with Messina Marittima station, located by the port and constituting a Ferry transport in the Strait of Messina to Villa San Giovanni station across the Strait of Messina. In 2021 the harbor of Messina was the busiest passenger port in Europe with over 8.232.000 passenger crossings in one year.

The station is electrified and served by regional trains. For long-distance transport it counts some InterCity and ICN night trains to Rome, linking it also with Milan, Turin, Venice, Genoa, Bologna, Florence, and other cities. It is also part of the projected Berlin–Palermo railway axis.

Since 2010, a suburban train service has been carried out along the Messina-Catania-Syracuse railway with routes serving the stations of Fiumara Gazzi, Contesse, Tremestieri, Mili Marina, Galati, Ponte Santo Stefano, Ponte Schiavo, San Paolo and Giampilieri.

Bus and tram 
Messina's public bus system is operated by ATM Messina: starting from 8 October 2018, has reorganized the offer of public transport, introducing a bus line (line 1 - Shuttle 100) which with a frequency of approx. 15 minutes, it crosses 38 of the total 50 km of the coast of the City of Messina. Thus, a comb service is created, with interchange stops at which the buses to and from the villages terminate, and with the tram which reaches a frequency of about 20 minutes. About 36 different routes reach every part of the city and also the modern Messina tramway (at "Repubblica" stop, on station's square), opened in 2003.

The industrial plan provides for the purchase of about 66 buses in the three-year period 2020–2022 to improve the environmental performance and comfort of the fleet. Furthermore, the resources equal to 1.82 million euros, coming from the PON Metro 2014-2020 will allow:
Installation of the AVM system on the vehicles;
Installation of turnstiles on electric buses;
Implementation of the electronic ticketing system;
Installation of electronic poles.

Sports team
A.C.R. Messina
S.S.D. Città di Messina

Notable people

List of notable people from Messina or connected to Messina, listed by career and then in alphabetical order by last name.

Actors 

 Adolfo Celi, actor (born 1922)
Tano Cimarosa, actor (born 1922)
Maria Grazia Cucinotta, actress (born 1968)
Nino Frassica, actor (born 1950)
Massimo Mollica, actor (born 1929)
Adua Del Vesco, actress (born 1992)
Ninni Bruschetta, actor (born 1962)
Marina La Rosa, actress and Grande Fratello (season 1) contestant (born 1977)
Gino Buzzanca, actor (born 1912)

Artists and designers 

 Girolamo Alibrandi, painter (born in 1470)
 Anna Maria Arduino (1672 – 1700) 17th century painter, writer and socialite, served as the Princess of Piombino, from Messina.
 Antonio Barbalonga, painter (17th century)
 Francesco Comande, painter (16th century)
 Antonello da Messina, major painter of the Renaissance (born 1430)
 Giuseppe Migneco, painter (born 1908)
 Giovanni Quagliata, painter (born 1603)
 Filippo Juvarra, Baroque architect (born 1678)
 Mariano Riccio, painter (born 1510)
 Alonzo Rodriguez, painter (born 1578)
 Giovanni Tuccari, painter (born 1667)
 Pino da Messina, painter (born 15th century)

Politicians, civil service, military 

 Giuseppe La Farina, leader of the Italian Risorgimento (born 1815)
 Gaetano Martino, politician, physician and professor. (born 1900)
 Giuseppe Natoli, lawyer and politician (born 1815)
 Luigi Rizzo, naval officer and First World War hero (born 1887)
 Carlo Stagno D’Alcontres, politician, Prince of Alcontres and mayor of Messina (born 1913)

Musicians, composers 

 Mario Aspa, composer (born 1797)
 Filippo Bonaffino (fl. 1623), Italian madrigal composer
 Alberto Urso, singer (born 1997)
 Peppino D'Agostino, guitarist (born 1956)

Religion 

 Eustochia Smeralda Calafato, saint (born 1434)
 Annibale Maria Di Francia, saint (born 1851)
 Pope Leo II, bishop of Rome (born 611)

Sports 

 Tony Cairoli, motocross world champion (born 1985)
 Vincenzo Nibali, cyclist (born 1984)
 Antonio Stelitano, Italian footballer (born 1987)
 Antonino Ragusa, Italian footballer (born 1990)

Researchers, academics 
Aristocles of Messene, peripatetic philosopher (1st century AD)
Dicaearchus, Greek philosopher and mathematician (born 350 BC)
Caio Domenico Gallo, historian (born 1697)
Francesco Maurolico, astronomer, mathematician and humanist (born 1494)
Agostino Scilla, painter, paleontologist, geologist and pioneer in the study of fossils (born 1629)
Giuseppe Seguenza, naturalist and geologist (born 1833)
Giuseppe Sergi, anthropologist and psychologist (born 1841)
Michele Parrinello, physicist (born 1945)
Giulio Tarro, doctor and scientist (born 1938)
Gaetano Martino, scientist (born 1900)

Others 
Stefano D'Arrigo, writer (born 1919)
Guido delle Colonne, judge and writer (13th century)
Santi Visalli, American photographer and photojournalist (born 1932)
Tommaso Cannizzaro, writer (born 1838)

Literary references

Numerous writers set their works in Messina, including:
Plutarch – The Life of Pompey (40 BC?)
Giovanni Boccaccio – Decameron IV day V novel, Lisabetta da Messina – IV day IV Novel, Gerbino ed Elissa (1351)
Matteo Bandello – Novelliere First Part, novel XXII (1554)
William Shakespeare – Much Ado about Nothing (1598) and Antony and Cleopatra (1607)
Molière – L'Étourdi ou Les Contre-temps (1654)
Friedrich Schiller – Die Braut von Messina (The Bride of Messina, 1803)
Silvio Pellico – Eufemio da Messina (1818)
Friedrich Nietzsche – Idyllen aus Messina (Idylls from Messina, 1882)
Giovanni Pascoli – poem L'Aquilone (1904)
Elio Vittorini – Le donne di Messina (Women of Messina, 1949) and Conversazione in Sicilia (Conversations in Sicily, 1941)
Stefano D'Arrigo – Horcynus Orca (1975)
Julien Green – Demain n'existe pas (1985)

See also
International Rally of Messina
Messina Centrale railway station
Messina Grand Prix held between 1959 and 1961
Strait of Messina Bridge
Torre Faro 224 metres tall lattice tower
Zanclean Age of the Pliocene Epoch in geology, named for Zancle, ancient Messina
Messinian Age of the Miocene Epoch in geology, named for Messina

Notes

Sources

External links

 

 
Coastal towns in Sicily
Mediterranean port cities and towns in Italy
Municipalities of the Metropolitan City of Messina
Cumaean colonies
Euboean colonies of Magna Graecia
Populated places established in the 8th century BC
8th-century BC establishments in Italy
Greek city-states
Cities destroyed by earthquakes